Brittany is a female given name, after the Brittany region of France, first given in the United States in 1966. It was frequently given in the United States in the late 1980s and early 1990s, peaking in popularity at rank 3 in 1991/2.

Other variant spellings include Britney, Brittney, Brittny, Britnee, Brittanee, and Brittani.

In entertainment
 Brittany Byrnes (born 1987), actress
 Brittany Curran (born 1990), actress
 Brittany Daniel (born 1976), actress
 Brittany Flickinger, reality TV personality
 Brittany Hargest, singer and dancer
 Britney Spears (born 1981), American singer
 Britney Young (born 1987/1988), an American actress
 Brittany Murphy (1977–2009), American actress
 Brittany O'Grady (born 1996), American actress
 Brittany Sheets (born 1988), better known as Mars Argo, singer-songwriter and Internet personality
 Brittany Snow (born 1986), actress
 Brittany Tiplady (born 1991), actress
 Brittany Underwood (born 1988), actress

In sports
 Brittany Bock (born 1987), American soccer player
 Brittany Bowe (born 1988), American long-track speed skater
 Brittany Boyd (born 1993), American basketball player
 Brittany Broben (born 1995), Australian diver 
 Brittany Brown, American professional wrestler
 Brittney Griner (born 1990), American basketball player
 Brittany Jackson (born 1983), basketball player
 Brittany Lincicome (born 1985), American golfer
 Brittany Baxter (born 1985), Canadian soccer player
 Brittany Viola (born 1987), American platform diver

Other
 Britnee Timberlake (born 1986), American politician
 Brittanie Cecil (1988–2002), teen who died when a puck hit her in the face during an NHL hockey game
 Brittany Hensel, sister to Abigail Hensel; the two are dicephalic conjoined twins
 Brittani Kline, American fashion model and America's Next Top Model contestant
 Brittany "Bre" Scullark, American fashion model and America's Next Top Model contestant
 Brittany "McKey" Sullivan, American fashion model and America's Next Top Model contestant

Pseudonyms
 Brittany CoxXx (born 1978), American trans woman performer.

Fictional characters
 Brittany Marsino, a character in the TV series The Young and the Restless
Brittany Miller, member of the Chipettes
 Brittany Pierce, a character in the TV series Glee
 Brittany Quilty, a character in the film Cyberbully
 Brittany Rose, a character in the film Cyberbully
 Brittany Weston, a character in the TV series Thirtysomething
 Brittany Forgler, the protagonist in the film Brittany Runs a Marathon
 Brittney Wong, a minor character in the cartoon series, Star Vs. the Forces of Evil
 Brittany Taylor, a character in the cartoon series, Daria
 Brittany "Brit" Crust, an antagonist from the cartoon series, My Life as a Teenage Robot
 Brittany, a character from the video game, Pikmin 3
 Brittany Biskit, a twin antagonist along with misspelled Whittany Biskit from Littlest Pet Shop

See also
Britney (disambiguation)
Brittny

References

External links
 Origin of the word Brittany
 Social Security Administration Office of the Chief Actuary

Feminine given names
English feminine given names